Cherrywood or similar terms may refer to:

 Cherrywood, Dublin, a business park and suburb of Dublin
 The wood of a cherry tree
 Cherrywood Elementary School in the Berryessa Union School District of California
 Cherrywood, an electoral ward in Farnborough, Hampshire, England
 Cherrywood Village, St. Matthews, Kentucky, United States, a neighborhood
 Cherry Wood, a nature reserve in London